Reynolds Township is located in Lee County, Illinois. As of the 2010 census, its population was 297 and it contained 127 housing units. Reynolds Township formed from Brooklyn Township in September, 1858.

Geography

Demographics

References

External links
US Census
City-data.com
Cook County Official Site
Illinois State Archives

Townships in Lee County, Illinois
1858 establishments in Illinois
Populated places established in 1858
Townships in Illinois